The Aerial Derby was an air race in the United Kingdom sponsored by the Daily Mail in which the competitors flew a circuit around London.  It was first held in 1912, with subsequent races in 1913 and 1914.  Suspended during the First World War, the event was revived in 1919 with a "Victory Aerial Derby".  Further races were held in 1920, 1921,1922 and 1923.  Although a race was scheduled for 1924 there were insufficient entries, and the event was cancelled and not held again.

1912
The first race, held on Saturday 8 June consisted of a single circuit of an  course, starting and finishing at Hendon Aerodrome with control points at Kempton Park, Esher, Purley and Purfleet.  At these contestants had to fly low enough for the judges to see the race number of their aircraft.  The first prize was £250 and a gold cup.

The first competition was the subject of enormous public interest, with around 45,000 people paying to view the start and finish at Hendon and enormous crowds gathering along the route.

Sopwith was the first contestant to finish; he was then disqualified for having missed the control point at Purley. He appealed against the judgement, and was later pronounced the winner: visibility had been poor, and Sopwith had in fact passed well outside the marker, unseen by the judges.

Fifteen aviators were expected to start the race but due to the bad weather only seven started:

1913
The second competition was held on Saturday 20 September, and was flown over a slightly longer  course, alterations having been made because the original route crossed areas prohibited under the recently passed Air Navigation Order. As well as the Daily Mail  trophy and £200 prize a trophy and three prizes of £100, £70 and £25 were given by Shell for the winner of a handicap competition.

Entrants and results

1914
Originally to be held on 23 May, but postponed to 6 June due to poor weather conditions.  Weather conditions on the day it was held were little better, with some contestants failing to start because they had been unable to fly to Hendon on the day.  Won by Walter Brock.

Entrants and results

1919
Dubbed the "Victory Aerial Derby" in reference to the Allied victory in World War I and held on 21 June over the same course as the 1914 event, but due to the increased speed of aircraft over two circuits rather than one. Won by G. Gathergood flying a D.H.4R with M.C. Hammersley flying an Avro Baby winning the handicap race.

Entrants and results

1920
No longer sponsored by the Daily Mail, for the 1920 event the prizes were given by the Royal Aero Club. These were £500 for the overall winner, with three prizes of £250, £100 and £50 for the first three places in the handicap competition. The overall winner was F. T. Courtney, and the handicap competition was won by H. A. Hammersley.

Entrants and results'

1921
Again sponsored by the Royal Aero Club and held on 16 July with a prize of £500 for the overall winner and three prizes of £200, £100, and £50 for the first three places in the handicap competition.

Entrants and results

1922
For the 1922 competition, held on 7 August, the start and finish point was transferred to Croydon Aerodrome, with the control points at Brooklands, Hertford, Epping and West Thurrock making a circuit of just under . The competition was won by L. R. Tait-Cox flying a Gloucester Mars I and the handicap competition by L. L. Carter flying a Bristol M.1D.

Entrants and results

1923
Held on 6 August, with the course slightly modified by eliminating the Epping control point.

Entrants and results

1924
The 1924 competition was to have been held at Lympne aerodrome in Kent, the contestants to fly four laps of a 50 mi (80 km) circuit, but the event was cancelled due to there being too few high speed entrants.

References

External links
Pathé News newsreel of 1919 race
Pathé News newsreel of 1921 race
Pathé News newsreel of 1922 race
Pathé News newsreel of 1923 race

Air races
Recurring sporting events established in 1912
1924 disestablishments in England
1912 establishments in England
Recurring events disestablished in 1924